Amir ol Mowmenin or Amir ol Momenin may refer to:
 Amir ol Mowmenin, Andika, Khuzestan Province
 Amir ol Mowmenin, Omidiyeh, Khuzestan Province
 Amir ol Mowmenin, Bahmai, Kohgiluyeh and Boyer-Ahmad Province
 Amir ol Mowmenin, Kohgiluyeh, Kohgiluyeh and Boyer-Ahmad Province